Pedro Moreno may refer to:

 Pedro Moreno (soldier) (1775-1817), Mexican insurgent
 Pedro Moreno (actor) (born 1980), Cuban actor
 Pedro Moreno (footballer) (born 1951), Spanish footballer

See also 

 Pedro Morenés (born 1948), Spanish politician